Drummer of Vengeance (also known as Day of Judgment, Doomsday and An Eye for an Eye) is a 1971 Italian Spaghetti Western film written and directed by Mario Gariazzo and starring Ty Hardin, Rossano Brazzi and Craig Hill.

Plot
On his return a war veteran finds his farmhouse burned to the ground. His young Native American wife and his little son have died in the flames. Responsible are a bunch of men who killed this man's family out of rage about his stance in the war. Using a false identity he goes to the close-by town where the murderers are to be found. He finds and confronts them one by one. Each time he uses his dead son's wind-up toy to remind them on their crime while he challenges them to a duel which none of them survives.

Cast 

 Ty Hardin as The Stranger 
 Rossano Brazzi as The  Sheriff
 Craig Hill as  O'Connor
 Gordon Mitchell as  Deputy Norton
  Edda Di Benedetto as   Prairie Fowler
 Rosalba Neri as  	Rising Sun 
 Guido Lollobrigida as   Clay 
  Pinuccio Ardia  as Mr. Higgins
 Raf Baldassarre as Jason
 Stelio Candelli as   Deputy Miller
 Umberto Raho as  The Mayor 
 Ken Wood as Blackie 
 Bruno Corazzari as Bill 
 Federico Boido

References

External links

English-language Italian films
Spaghetti Western films
1971 Western (genre) films
1971 films
Films directed by Mario Gariazzo
1970s English-language films
1970s Italian films